The first USS Colorado, a , three-masted steam screw frigate, was launched on 19 June 1856, by the Norfolk Navy Yard. Named after the Colorado River, she was sponsored by Ms. N. S. Dornin, and commissioned on 13 March 1858, with Captain W. H. Gardner, in command.

Pre-Civil War 
Putting to sea from Boston on 12 May 1858, Colorado cruised in Cuban waters deterring the practice of search by British cruisers until 6 August, when she returned to Boston and was placed in ordinary until 1861.

Civil War 
Colorado was recommissioned on 3 June 1861, and sailed from Boston on 18 June, to join the Union Navy's Gulf Blockading Squadron. She was under the task force commander, Commodore William Marvine, acting as his flagship for the Blockade. On 14 September, an expedition under Lieutenant J. H. Russell, from Colorado, cut out the schooner Judah, believed to be preparing for service as a privateer and spiked one gun of a battery at the Pensacola Navy Yard, losing three men in the raid. On 11 December, another expedition was sent to Pilot Town, and succeeded in capturing a small schooner and two men. Colorado assisted in the capture of the steamer Calhoun (or Cuba) on 23 January 1862, off South West Pass, at the mouth of the Mississippi River, and a week later engaged four Confederate steamers.

In April 1862, Colorado, built for fighting at sea, was prevented from participating in the Battle of New Orleans because her draft was too deep to cross the bar. Nineteen guns and one howitzer were removed and distributed across the fleet. She returned to Boston, on 21 June, and was decommissioned from 28 June-10 November.

Colorado sailed from Portsmouth, New Hampshire, on 9 December, to rejoin the blockading force off Mobile, Alabama, on 13 March 1863. She shared in the capture of the schooner Hunter on 17 May. Returning to Portsmouth Navy Yard, on 4 February 1864, she was again placed out of commission from 18 February-1 September.

Clearing Portsmouth, on 6 October, she joined the North Atlantic Blockading Squadron and cruised off the coast of North Carolina, until 26 January 1865. Colorado participated in the bombardment and capture of Fort Fisher from 13 to 15 January. She was struck six times by enemy fire which killed one man and wounded two.

By late 1864, Wilmington, North Carolina, was the only port left to the Confederacy. Its access to the sea was protected by Fort Fisher, at the mouth of the Cape Fear River.

A joint Army-Navy attack in December failed (the First Battle of Fort Fisher, 7–27 December 1864).[4]

A second attack came in January (the Second Battle of Fort Fisher, 13–15 January 1865). Colorado was engaged, and George Dewey played a key role in her success.

Colorado, being a wooden ship, was placed in the line outside the monitors and other armored vessels, but got a full share of conflict. Toward the end of the second engagement Admiral Porter signaled Commodore Thatcher to close in and silence a certain part of the works. As Colorado had already received considerable damage, her officers remonstrated. But Dewey, who had now acquired marked tactical ability, was quick to see the advantage to be gained by the move and the work was taken in fifteen minutes. The New York Times, commenting upon this part of the action, spoke of it as "the most beautiful duel of the war". When Admiral Porter came to congratulate Commodore Thatcher the latter said generously: "You must thank Lieutenant Dewey, sir. It was his move." Nevertheless, Thatcher was promoted to rear admiral. He tried to take Dewey with him as his fleet captain when he went to supersede Farragut at Mobile Bay. This was not permitted, but Dewey was promoted to lieutenant-commander.[4]

Prizes

Post-Civil War

European Squadron 
From 3 February – 25 May 1865, Colorado was again out of commission at New York Navy Yard. Ordered to the European Squadron as flagship, she sailed on 11 June, and cruised off England, Portugal, and Spain, and in the Mediterranean and Adriatic Seas until she departed Cherbourg, on 23 July 1867, for New York, where she was placed in ordinary from 7 September 1867 – 15 February 1870. During this period LCDR Dewey's next tour of duty was in 1867 and 1868, as executive officer on board Colorado.

Asiatic Squadron 
Colorado was flagship of the Asiatic Squadron. America had emerged from the Civil War and its foreign policy at the time was to rival the European powers (France, Russia and Britain) in their efforts to establish trade and spheres of influence in China, Japan, and Korea.

Colorado cruised on the Asiatic Station from 9 April 1870 – 15 March 1873. As flagship for Rear Admiral John Rodgers' squadron, she carried the U.S. Minister (to China and Korea) on a diplomatic mission in April 1871.

On 1 June 1871, an unprovoked attack was made on two ships of the squadron by shore batteries from two Korean forts on the Salee River. When no explanation was offered, a punitive expedition known as the Sinmiyangyo was mounted that destroyed the forts and inflicted heavy casualties on the Koreans.

Clearing Hong Kong, on 21 November 1872, Colorado sailed, by way of Singapore and Cape Town, for New York, arriving on 11 March 1873.

North Atlantic Squadron 
Colorado sailed from New York, on 12 December, to cruise the North Atlantic Station, and became flagship of the North Atlantic Squadron on 27 August 1874.

Decommissioned 
Returning to New York, on 30 May 1876, Colorado was placed out of commission on 8 June. From 1876 to 1884, she was used as a receiving ship at New York Navy Yard. She was sold on 14 February 1885, to a private company; and broken up for salvage material and burned for her copper fastenings.

While the ship was being broken up off of Plum Beach, near Port Washington, Long Island, a fire broke out on the forward decks, which was where boards were being burnt for iron spikes. Along with Colorado, these other ships went down after they were burnt. The company that had been breaking the ships up, Stannard & Co., claimed at the time that the fire may have caused a more than $100,000 loss.

See also 

List of steam frigates of the United States Navy
Bibliography of early American naval history
Union Navy

References 

 Silverstone, Paul H. Warships of the Civil War Navies Naval Institute Press, Annapolis, MD, 1989, .

Steamships of the United States Navy
Ships of the Union Navy
American Civil War patrol vessels of the United States
1856 ships
Ships built in Portsmouth, Virginia